Regnell is a Swedish surname. Notable people with the surname include:

Anders Fredrik Regnell (1807–1884), Swedish physician and botanist
Elsa Regnell (1889–1967), Swedish Olympic diver
Lisa Regnell (1887–1979), Swedish Olympic diver, sister of Elsa
Nils Regnell (1884–1950), Swedish Olympic swimmer, brother of Elsa and Lisa

Swedish-language surnames